Pržno may refer to:

Czech Republic
Pržno (Frýdek-Místek District), a municipality and village in the Moravian-Silesian Region
Pržno (Vsetín District) a municipality and village in the Zlín Region

Montenegro
Pržno, Budva, a village
Pržno, an inlet in Tivat Municipality